Tango Palace may refer to:
 Tango Palace (Paul Bley album), 1985
 Tango Palace (Dr. John album), 1979